Kert Kütt (born 9 October 1980 in Pärnu) is a retired Estonian professional footballer who last played for Paide Linnameeskond in the Estonian Meistriliiga as a goalkeeper. He has previously had spells in Estonian Meistriliiga and the Finnish Veikkausliiga.

References

External links
 
 

1980 births
Living people
Estonian footballers
Association football goalkeepers
FCI Levadia Tallinn players
Nõmme Kalju FC players
Estonian expatriate footballers
Estonian expatriate sportspeople in Finland
Expatriate footballers in Finland
Kotkan Työväen Palloilijat players
Estonian expatriate sportspeople in Norway
Expatriate footballers in Norway
Paide Linnameeskond players
Sportspeople from Pärnu
FCI Levadia U21 players
Meistriliiga players
Veikkausliiga players
FC Kuressaare players
Viljandi JK Tulevik players